Dolev is a surname. Notable people with the surname include:

Danny Dolev, Israeli computer scientist 
Dolev–Yao model used in cryptographic protocols
Shlomi Dolev (born 1958), Israeli computer scientist